Penn-Jersey Shipbuilding Corp. of Camden, New Jersey was a shipyard opened in March 1940 to build ships for World War II under the Emergency Shipbuilding Program. 	The shipyard was on Cooper Point at north end of North 5th Street at  .  After building 29 vessels Penn-Jersey Shipbuilding Corp. closed in June 1945 after building its last vessels.

Ships built
Penn-Jersey Shipbuilding Corp. built ships:
	Barracuda for Panama Canal Comm. a Patrol Launch
	Albacore for Panama Canal Comm.	Patrol Launch
Four US Coast Guard	Patrol Launches
	General Construction barge
	USS Firm (AM-98) US Navy	Minesweeper
	USS Force (AM 99)	US Navy	Minesweeper

 Cargo ships 258 foot type N3-M-A1 for United States Maritime Commission:
	Elias D. Knight, became USS Enceladus (AK-80)
	William Lester	
	Eben H. Linnell	
	Asa Lothrop	
	Laughlin McKay	
	Oliver R. Mumford, became Media (AK-83)	
	William Nott	
	John L. Manson	
	Nathaniel Matthews	
	Josiah Paul, became Nashira (AK-85)	
	Sumner Pierce, became Norma (AK-86)
	Moses Pike	
	Symmes Potter, became Tucana (AK-88)	
	Charles A. Ranlett	
US Navy 173 foot Submarine chasers:
	PC 1221	
	PC 1222, after war converted to a yacht the Gosse 
	PC 1223
	PC 1224
For Western Maryland Railway	two Car Float
	Car Float 21
	Car Float 22

See also
Wooden boats of World War II
Bethlehem Elizabethport
Bethlehem Brooklyn 56th Street

References

Defunct shipbuilding companies of the United States
Companies based in Camden, New Jersey
Shipyards of New Jersey